MapleStory 2 is a free-to-play massively multiplayer online role-playing game, developed by NSquare in association with Nexon and NCSoft. MapleStory 2 was released on 7 July 2015 in Korea. The game takes many of the features of the original game, MapleStory, and applies them to a 3D voxel-based environment. Most enemies, NPCs, and locations made a return in this sequel, although with several changes.

Gameplay 

Unlike its predecessor, MapleStory 2 features third-person movement, and a "blocky look, similar to Minecraft" according to Polygon's Jullia Lee. The game contains features commonly seen in MMORPGs, such as a leveling system and customizable weapons and armour, but also a "Battle Royale" mode, PVP arena and interior decoration minigame. There were also a number of premium in-game currencies, called the Blue Meret and Meso Token respectively, which allowed players to buy unique equipment for their characters in the global servers.  The premium currency in the Korean version of the game is simply called the Meret.

Release 
On April 14, 2018, the global version of MapleStory 2 was announced for release with the first days of closed beta scheduled from May 9 to 16, 2018. On June 8, 2018, Nexon announced the launching of a second closed beta to launch on the July 18. On August 21, 2018, Nexon announced the global release of MapleStory 2. The game was released globally on October 10, 2018 as a premier event.

On March 18, 2020, the game's management teams announced that its Japanese and global services would be closed permanently as of May 27, 2020.  An official archive page was set up by Nexon, with illustrations and concept art available for download for free. On 31 August 2022, Tencent announced that Maplestory 2 would close its servers in China on 2 November 2022.  The game still continues its service in Korea.

References

External links
 

2015 video games
Gamebryo games
MapleStory
Massively multiplayer online role-playing games
Nexon games
Video games developed in South Korea
Windows games
Windows-only games
Products and services discontinued in 2020
Products and services discontinued in 2022